The mouse bandicoot (Microperoryctes murina) is a species of marsupial in the family Peramelidae. It is endemic to West Papua, Indonesia. Its natural habitat is subtropical or tropical dry forests.

References

Peramelemorphs
Marsupials of New Guinea
Mammals of Western New Guinea
Endemic fauna of Indonesia
Mammals described in 1932
Least concern biota of Oceania
Taxonomy articles created by Polbot